The Fool Killer (also known as Violent Journey) is a 1965 adventure drama film starring Edward Albert and Anthony Perkins. It was based on the 1954 novel of the same name by Helen Eustis.

Plot
A 12-year-old boy roams the post-Civil War South with a philosophical axe murderer.

See also
List of American films of 1965
List of Mexican films of 1965

References

External links

Knoxville News Sentinel Photo Gallery of East Tennessee Movie Making: The Fool Killer (1965)

1965 films
1960s adventure drama films
American adventure drama films
American International Pictures films
Mexican adventure drama films
Mexican adventure films
Films directed by Servando González
Films based on American novels
1965 drama films
1960s English-language films
1960s American films